Dan Lurie (April 1, 1923 – November 6, 2013) was an American bodybuilder, television personality, entrepreneur, and world record holder. He was regarded as a pioneer in physical fitness and a founding father of bodybuilding. Lurie had won the Mr. America title of "America's Most Muscular Man" four times by 1949, and in 1984 made history by arm wrestling U.S. President Ronald Reagan on the Oval Office desk in the White House.

Biography 
Lurie was born in New York, New York, graduated from Samuel J. Tilden High School and later moved to North Woodmere on Long Island where he lived until age 90.  A world-class bodybuilder in the 1940s, Lurie won numerous titles in the Mr. America competitions. In 1948, he established the International Federation of Body Builders and later went on to create The World Body Building Guild.  In the 1950s he went on to star as "Sealtest Dan, The Muscle Man" in a long-running CBS TV series called The Sealtest Big Top.

Throughout his career, Lurie had a long-standing and well-known rivalry with his former business partner, Joe Weider.  As a magazine publisher, bodybuilding  trainer and contest promoter, Lurie also had well publicized relationships with Arnold Schwarzenegger and Lou Ferrigno.  These relationships both ended in litigation; the details of which were controversially detailed in Lurie's 2009 book Heart of Steel, to which Regis Philbin contributed a foreword.  Throughout his colorful career, Lurie honored and befriended many Hollywood stars such as Mae West, Steve Reeves and Clint Eastwood.  In the course of his career in the fitness realm from the 1940s through the year 2000, Lurie owned and operated numerous Dan Lurie Gyms and Health Clubs in New York and Miami Beach that attracted celebrities and bodybuilders alike. Sylvester Stallone famously trained at one of them.

Lurie manufactured his own line of weights, exercise equipment and nutritional supplements which he sold via catalog and through the flagship chain of stores he owned and operated in New York called Dan Lurie's Sports World.  Additionally, Lurie was known for creating and publishing several successful international magazine titles that included Muscle Training Illustrated, Wrestling Training Illustrated, World Karate, World Champion Boxing and Hot Rock.

He was still active well into his 80s when he came out of semi-retirement to promote new bodybuilding events and products.  At age 90 he continued to make plans to create and promote bodybuilding shows and travel to schools, universities and conventions to speak out in regard to the dangers of drugs and steroids in sports as he had done for years before.  Lurie was a staunch promoter of clean athletics and natural bodybuilding and claims to have never used performance enhancement drugs.  He was famous for his trademark slogan "Health Is Your Greatest Wealth".

Television career
Lurie appeared on the Sealtest Big Top Circus Variety Show on CBS. This was the first color television program in the USA. He played "Sealtest Dan, The Muscle Man". Ed McMahon played a clown. Lurie also appeared as "The Mighty Rewop" in the popular children's TV series Captain Video.

Hall Of Fame
On April 29, 2007, Lurie was inducted into the National Jewish Sports Hall of Fame.

Strength and endurance records
1225 parallel dips in 90 minutes 
A one-handed overhead bent press with 285 lb bodyweight 168 lb 
Leg press with 1230 lb 
Back lift of 1810 lb

References

External links
 Dan Lurie Official website

 Muscular Development article by Joe Pietaro, July 2009

1923 births
2013 deaths
21st-century American Jews
American bodybuilders
American male writers
Television personalities from New York City
Jewish American sportspeople
People associated with physical culture
Writers from Brooklyn
People from North Woodmere, New York
Samuel J. Tilden High School alumni